Zoboomafoo is a live-action/animated children's television series that originally aired on PBS from January 25, 1999, to November 21, 2001. It was formerly shown in public television (depending on the area) and was regularly shown on Sprout until 2012. A total of 65 episodes were aired. A creation of the Kratt Brothers (Chris and Martin), it features a talking lemur (a Coquerel's sifaka) named Zoboomafoo, performed by Canadian puppeteer Gord Robertson (who had also puppeteered on Jim Henson's Fraggle Rock), and mainly portrayed by a lemur named Jovian, along with a collection of returned animal guests. Every episode begins with the Kratt brothers in Animal Junction, a peculiar place in which the rules of nature change and wild animals come to visit and play.

On November 10, 2014, Jovian died in his home at the Duke Lemur Center in Durham, North Carolina at the age of 20 due to kidney failure.

Premise and structure
Upon their arrival at Animal Junction, the Kratt brothers (Chris and Martin Kratt) lean out the window and call Zoboomafoo ("Zoboo" and "Zob" for short), shown in a live-action segment as an actual lemur (Jovian) leaping across a field to reach them. When he comes to Animal Junction, he won't talk to the Kratt brothers until they give him a snack, generally appropriate lemur food like garbanzo beans, sweet potato, or mango slices. After he's done eating his snack, he promptly burps, saying, "Excuse me," and spins around on a turntable, shouting, "Zoboomafoo-oo-oo-oo-oo!" at which point he becomes a talking lemur puppet (voiced by Robertson). He then leads into the main segment of the episode by describing a "Mangatsika!" (a Malagasy word meaning "cold," but used in the series to mean "cool") animal that he saw on his way to Animal Junction. As he describes the animal, a song is played, "Who Could It Be?", while a cartoon shows the characteristics of the "mystery animal." At the end of the song, Chris and Martin try to guess the animal Zoboo has described, and the mystery is revealed when the animal or animals arrive at Animal Junction.

Each episode has a theme. The arrival of the "mystery animal," generally used as exposition, leads Zoboo, Chris and Martin into a conversation about the animal. Once or twice every episode, Zoboo says that some event in Animal Junction reminds him of a time in Zobooland, where he tells stories about his best friends in Zobooland.

Narchi: A teal elephant who uses his nose for a handful of tasks, like playing Goobleberry Catch and planting Goobleberry bushes all over Zobooland when the berries have seeds in them.
Gooble: A purple bear who eats fruit called Goobleberries and drinks Goobleberry jelly (the juice from Goobleberries).
Sensit: A blue-violet mouse lemur typically plays around and walks on his fingers.
Wiggy Waxwing: A blue and red chicken who likes to sing and eat Root Noodles.
Green Puppy: A green puppy who loves to play in Goobleberry jelly.
Slimantha: A yellow and blue salamander that likes to slide around and loves to hug her friends, despite them slipping out of her grip. At first, she had hydrophobia but overcame her fear when playing with Zoboo and Fibby.
Noggendrill: An orange mole with a drill horn he uses to dig.
Snow Lemur: A shy blue and white lemur that lives on top of Mt. Zoboomafoo.
Mama and Baby Zoboomafooasaurus: Two dinosaurs (possibly a Ceratosaurus --due to having them one horn on the noses) that the animals often play on.
Sensit's Little Sisters: Three small mouse lemurs related to Sensit also play around.
Buggly: A gravelly-voiced bug that Zoboo rides on.
Fibby: A sea creature with an octopus tentacle and a lobster claw.
Cy: A flying green one-eyed squid introduced in the second season.

These segments are animated, using clay animation and feature distinct voices for each character.

After the first Zobooland story, Zoboo singing about feeling that different creature, and the mystery animal leaving, Zoboo, Chris, and Martin received a letter from the Animal Helpers (Jackie in the first season and Amy in the second season), who show children how to help animals. This leads to Chris and Martin visiting creatures related to the theme, always beginning with the song "Going to the Closet" sung by Zoboo (and sometimes the characters from Zobooland). When Chris and Martin return to Animal Junction to see Zoboo talking to another mystery animal. At the end of each episode and after the second Zobooland story, Zoboo and the brothers sign off by singing "Animal Friends," which tells us why animals are friends to everyone, despite being different species. Finally, Zoboo turns back into a normal lemur and returns to Madagascar while saying goodbye to Chris and Martin. Chris and Martin also leave Animal Junction to better demonstrate the day's theme, traveling to a region, often in India or Africa, to visit the creatures there.

Before the credits of each episode, kids show and tell the viewers about all kinds of animals and pets they have, and a disclaimer is played telling the viewers that they should be careful with the animals they meet. Then Chris and Martin mention animal facts that lead Zoboo to a joke. Example: "Knock knock! Who's there? Panther. Panther, who? Panther no pants, I'm going swimming!" The disclaimer and joke were edited out for non-PBS airings (except for On-Demand viewings and Sprout).

Cast
 Chris Kratt as himself
 Martin Kratt as himself
 Jovian and Gord Robertson as Zoboomafoo, Zobooland Characters (voices only)
 Samantha Tolkacz as Jackie (Season 1)
 Genevieve Farrell as Amy (Season 2)

Segments
 Zoboomafoo Theme
 The Mystery Animal (Song: “Who Could It Be?”)
 Zobooland Story #1
 Duck/Animal Helpers with Jackie/Amy
 A Journey to Visit Animals (Song: “Going to the Closet”)
 Zobooland Story #2
 Ending Theme: Animal Friends

Episodes

Running gags
The series has some forms of slapstick and situation comedy as well. It starts when Zoboo burps after eating a snack, saying, "Excuse me," and spins around on a turntable, shouting, "Zoboomafoo-oo-oo-oo-oo!" Running gags of the series include Chris and Martin (and sometimes, Zoboo) falling into a swimming pool, a mud puddle and even simply falling. The most prominent of these recurring jokes is the "closet" gag, reminiscent of Fibber McGee and Molly, only it involves a crammed closet that Chris and Martin open to gather needed items for exploration. As Zoboo sings a song about the brothers' preparations for a trip, Chris and Martin open the door. An avalanche of outdoor items and clothes fall on them, knocking them over and resulting in laughter. Then they emerge from the pile of gear, fully equipped for their trip. In the episode "Running," Chris and Martin open the closet, expecting to be buried under its contents, only to find it clean and organized. A form of slapstick comedy shown is when Zoboo or the brothers get hit by flying items, such as pies, balls, and even yarn thrown by animals. Also, just before the trip, there is always a bird that flies down towards Animal Junction, making Chris and Martin yell, "Incoming! Duck!" Very rarely is the bird an actual duck. Often it's a peregrine falcon named Sticky Feet or a barn owl named Moon Face. Some of Zoboo's catchphrases include "Mangatsika!" (a Malagasy phrase meaning "cold" which was mistakenly used instead of "Milay" which is the Malagasy version of the English word "Cool!"), "I meant to do that!", "I can't believe my mind!", "I'm voky!" and "Hey! Hoo! Hubba hubba!".

Animal Helpers
Another segment of the series features a group of kids known as the "Animal Helpers," who send messages to the Kratt brothers at Animal Junction through a series of birds: a turkey vulture (named Tomatohead), a barn owl (called Moonface), a lanner falcon (named Sandstorm), a peregrine falcon (named Stickyfeet), a great horned owl (called Blink), a saker falcon, a golden eagle (named Talon), a duck, a snowy owl, a crow and several others.

The letters lead into short stories illustrating the Animal Helpers' interactions with the animals in their environments, performing small tasks such as placing a baby bird back in its nest or leading a calf back to a mother cow. Samantha Tolkacz appeared on the series as Jackie from its introduction on January 25, 1999, until April 27, 2000. Genevieve Farrell replaced her, appearing as Amy for the rest of the series.

Zoboomafoo would also give the animals interesting names that have to do with their appearance, behavior, or personality. Examples include a baby Indian elephant named "Toothbrush" because of his bristly hair; a young female chimpanzee named "Brainiac" because chimps are very intelligent; and two sloths named "Slow" and "Slower."

Production notes
Zoboomafoo was produced by PBS KIDS, CINAR Corporation (now WildBrain), and the Kratt brothers' Earth Creatures Company.

Partial filming for the series took place on location at the Duke Lemur Center in Durham, North Carolina. Although the last new episode aired on PBS Kids in November 2001, most PBS stations continued to rerun Zoboomafoo episodes in syndication until January 2004. In addition, Sprout aired reruns until February 2012.

After production on the series ended, in 2003, the Kratt Brothers began another series titled Be the Creature on the National Geographic Channel. In 2011, they created the animated series Wild Kratts, which currently airs on PBS Kids and TVOntario.

Jovian (a captive Coquerel's sifaka housed at the Duke Lemur Center) portrayed Zoboomafoo in the live-action segments (along with stand-ins). On November 10, 2014, he died of kidney failure in his home at age 20.

Telecast
The show was first premiered on PBS on January 25, 1999 and ended on November 21, 2001. It is formerly shown in public television (depending on the area). After the series ended, reruns aired on selected PBS stations until 2017. In addition, Sprout aired reruns until February 2012. The show was/is broadcast in the United States, Canada, Latin America, Brazil, Australia, New Zealand, Europe, Middle East, and India.

Awards and nominations
Zoboomafoo received the 2001 Emmy for Outstanding Directing in a Children's Series and a Parents' Choice Award for Spring 2001 and Silver Honor for Fall 2001.

Other media
There are also several video games for the PC based on Zoboomafoo, where children learn the alphabet and animals that correlate to each letter. Some of the letters have interactive games to go with them, such as a coloring page.

References

External links
 

1990s American animated television series
1990s American children's comedy television series
1990s Canadian animated television series
1990s Canadian children's television series
1990s Canadian comedy television series
1999 American television series debuts
1999 Canadian television series debuts
2000s American animated television series
2000s American children's comedy television series
2000s Canadian animated television series
2000s Canadian children's television series
2000s Canadian comedy television series
2001 American television series endings
2001 Canadian television series endings
American children's animated comedy television series
Canadian children's animated comedy television series
English-language television shows
PBS Kids shows
PBS original programming
Treehouse TV original programming
TVO original programming
Nature educational television series
American preschool education television series
Canadian preschool education television series
1990s preschool education television series
2000s preschool education television series
Animated preschool education television series
American television shows featuring puppetry
Canadian television shows featuring puppetry
Clay animation television series
American stop-motion animated television series
Canadian stop-motion animated television series
Television series by Cookie Jar Entertainment
American television series with live action and animation
Canadian television series with live action and animation
Television series about brothers
Television series about mammals
Fictional primates
American animated television spin-offs
Canadian animated television spin-offs
Television series created by Chris Kratt
Television series created by Martin Kratt